Pang Shigu was a general of the warlord Zhu Wen (future emperor Taizu of Later Liang) in the period preceding the collapse of the Tang Dynasty of China.  

Pang first distinguished himself during Zhu Wen’s campaigns against the rebels Huang Chao and later Qin Zongquan. Following this he gained more important positions and eventually the leadership of a full army. He successfully defeated and killed Shi Pu, governor of Ganhua and a powerful enemy of Zhu Wen. However when given command of an invasion of the territory of warlord Yang Xingmi he was defeated and killed by Yang at the Battle of Qingkou.

References

Tang dynasty people killed in battle
Chinese generals